Immaculate Conception Academy of Manila (also known as ICAM or ICA Manila)  is a private Catholic school facilitated by the Missionary Sisters of the Immaculate Conception (MIC).

External links
ICA Manila official website
(currently sponsored by the batch of 1983) Alumnae Association

Catholic elementary schools in Manila
Catholic secondary schools in Manila
Education in Tondo, Manila